The Australian cricket team in England in 1888 played 37 first-class matches including three Tests. England won the series 2–1, after losing the first Test. The next time England would come back from one down to win a three match Test series at home was in July 2020, after they beat the West Indies 2–1.

Touring party

 Alick Bannerman
 Jack Blackham (wicket-keeper)
 George Bonnor
 Harry Boyle
 Jack Edwards
 John Ferris
 Affie Jarvis (wicket-keeper)
 Sammy Jones
 John Lyons
 Percy McDonnell (captain)
 Harry Trott
 Charlie Turner
 Sammy Woods
 Jack Worrall

Test matches

First Test
Australian captain Percy McDonnell won the toss and chose to bat first. The visitors scored 116 runs in their innings, during which only Percy McDonnell, Jack Blackham and Test debutant Jack Edwards scored 20 runs or more. The English bowlers, led by Bobby Peel, who claimed four wickets and Johnny Briggs, who took three, ran through the Australian batting line-up. At the close of play on the opening day, England had scored eighteen runs for the loss of three wickets (18/3).

Resuming at 11.30 on day two, the score was lifted to 22, on which score England lost Walter Read, W. G. Grace (failing to add to his overnight ten), and Tim O'Brien. When Steel fell four runs later, England were seven wickets down and still eleven runs short of avoiding the follow-on. Thanks to Briggs, who top-scored for England with seventeen runs, the hosts managed to reach 53 from exactly fifty overs, after 55 minutes of play on the second day. The famous combination of John Ferris and Charlie Turner took eight of the wickets to fall, Turner picking up a five-for.

When Ferris and Turner arrived at the wicket in Australia's second innings, they found their side on eighteen for seven, with Lohmann and Peel demolishing the top- and middle-order. Turner scored a dozen and Ferris twelve, but The Daily Telegraph remarked that "it has to be said that never in the annals of cricket has such a fortunate innings as that of Ferris been compiled".

England needed 124 to win, but it managed to get only halfway. Of the home team's second innings of 62, Grace scored 24, "far and away the best batting display of the match," said the Daily Telegraph. Allan Steel, the captain, also chipped in with an unbeaten ten, but he was the only other batsman to reach double figures. Turner and Ferris claimed five wickets each, making for match figures of ten for 63 and eight for 45 respectively. The aforementioned newspaper, however, believed that Peel's first innings' four for 36 was a far better performance, as the wicket had been easier than at any other stage of the match.

This win was Australia's first over England since that at Sydney three years earlier. After that, the Antipodeans had been defeated on seven successive occasions. In the eight years since the 1880 visit, this was only Australia's second win in England, the other being the famous Test at the Oval in 1882.

Second Test

Third Test

Other first-class matches

Summary of results

Batting averages

Bowling averages

References

External links

1888 in Australian cricket
1888 in English cricket
1888
English cricket seasons in the 19th century
International cricket competitions from 1844 to 1888
1888